Bitch Mountain is a summit in Essex County, New York, in the United States.

Bitch Mountain has been noted for its unusual place name.

References

Mountains of Essex County, New York
Mountains of New York (state)